Assisted suicide is suicide undertaken with the aid of another person. The term usually refers to physician-assisted suicide (PAS), which is suicide that is assisted by a physician or another healthcare provider. Once it is determined that the person's situation qualifies under the physician-assisted suicide laws for that location, the physician's assistance is usually limited to writing a prescription for a lethal dose of drugs.

In many jurisdictions, helping a person die by suicide is a crime. People who support legalizing physician-assisted suicide want the people who assist in a voluntary death to be exempt from criminal prosecution for manslaughter or similar crimes. Physician-assisted suicide is legal in some countries, under certain circumstances, including Austria, Belgium, Canada, Germany, Luxembourg, the Netherlands, New Zealand, Spain, Switzerland, parts of the United States and all six states of Australia. The constitutional courts of Colombia, Germany and Italy legalized assisted suicide, but their governments have not legislated or regulated the practice yet.

In most of those states or countries, to qualify for legal assistance, individuals who seek a physician-assisted suicide must meet certain criteria, including: having a terminal illness, proving they are of sound mind, voluntarily and repeatedly expressing their wish to die, and taking the specified, lethal dose by their own hand. The laws vary in scope from place to place. In the United States, PAS is limited to those who have a prognosis of six months or less to live. In other countries such as Germany, Canada, Switzerland, Spain, Italy, Austria, Belgium and the Netherlands, a terminal diagnosis is not a requirement and voluntary euthanasia is additionally allowed.

Terminology

Suicide is the act of killing oneself. Assisted suicide is when another person materially helps an individual person die by suicide, such as providing tools or equipment, while physician-assisted suicide involves a physician (doctor) "knowingly and intentionally providing a person with the knowledge or means or both required to commit suicide, including counseling about lethal doses of drugs, prescribing such lethal doses or supplying the drugs".

Assisted suicide is contrasted to euthanasia, sometimes referred to as mercy killing, where the person dying does not directly bring about their own death, but is killed in order to stop the person from experiencing further suffering. Euthanasia can occur with or without consent, and can be classified as voluntary, non-voluntary or involuntary. Killing a person who is suffering and who consents is called voluntary euthanasia. This is currently legal in some regions. If the person is unable to provide consent it is referred to as non-voluntary euthanasia. Killing a person who does not want to die, or who is capable of giving consent and whose consent has not been solicited, is the crime of involuntary euthanasia, and is regarded as murder.

Right to die is the belief that people have a right to die, either through various forms of suicide, euthanasia, or refusing life-saving medical treatment.

Suicidism can be defined as "the quality or state of being suicidal" or as "... an oppressive system (stemming from non-suicidal perspectives) functioning at the normative, discursive, medical, legal, social, political, economic, and epistemic levels in which suicidal people experience multiple forms of injustice and violence ..."

Assisted dying versus assisted suicide
Some advocates for assisted suicide strongly oppose the use of "assisted suicide" and "suicide" when referring to physician-assisted suicide, and prefer phrases like "medical aid in dying" or "assisted dying". The motivation for this is to distance the debate from the suicides commonly performed by those not terminally ill and not eligible for assistance where it is legal. They feel those cases have negatively impacted the word "suicide" to the point that it should not be used to refer to the practice of a physician prescribing lethal drugs to a person with a terminal illness. However, in certain jurisdictions, like Canada, "aid in dying" does not require a person's natural death to be reasonably foreseeable in order to be eligible for MAiD. Moreover, the term "assisted dying" is also used to refer to other practices like voluntary euthanasia and terminal sedation

Physician-assisted suicide

Support

Arguments for
Arguments in support of assisted death include respect for patient autonomy, equal treatment of terminally ill patients on and off life support, compassion, personal liberty, transparency and ethics of responsibility. When death is imminent (half a year or less) patients can choose to have assisted death as a medical option to shorten what the person perceives to be an unbearable dying process. 

Death With Dignity is coined as the United States national leader in end of life advocacy and policy reform. The organization has been advocating for physician assisted suicide and euthanasia since 1994. 

Pain is mostly not reported as the primary motivation for seeking physician-assisted suicide in the United States; the three most frequently mentioned end‐of‐life concerns reported by Oregon residents who took advantage of the Death With Dignity Act in 2015 were: decreasing ability to participate in activities that made life enjoyable (96.2%), loss of autonomy (92.4%), and loss of dignity (75.4%).

Oregon statistics
A study of hospice nurses and social workers in Oregon reported that symptoms of pain, depression, anxiety, extreme air hunger and fear of the process of dying were more pronounced among hospice patients who did not request a lethal prescription for barbiturates, the drug used for physician assisted death.

A Journal of Palliative Medicine report on patterns of hospice use noted that Oregon was in both the highest quartile of hospice use and the lowest quartile of potentially concerning patterns of hospice use. A similar trend was found in Vermont, where aid-in-dying (AiD) was authorized in 2013.

In February 2016, Oregon released a report on their 2015 numbers. During 2015, there were 218 people in the state who were approved and received the lethal drugs to end their own life. Of that 218, 132 terminally ill patients ultimately made the decision to ingest drugs, resulting in their death. According to the state of Oregon Public Health Division's survey, the majority of the participants, 78%, were 65 years of age or older and predominantly white, 93.1%. 72% of the terminally ill patients who opted for ending their own lives had been diagnosed with some form of cancer. In the state of Oregon's 2015 survey, they asked the terminally ill who were participating in medical aid in dying, what their biggest end-of-life concerns were: 96.2% of those people mentioned the loss of the ability to participate in activities that once made them enjoy life, 92.4% mentioned the loss of autonomy, or their independence of their own thoughts or actions, and 75.4% stated loss of their dignity.

Washington State statistics
An increasing trend in deaths caused from ingesting lethal doses of medications prescribed by physicians was also noted in Washington: from 64 deaths in 2009 to 202 deaths in 2015. Among the deceased, 72% had terminal cancer and 8% had neurodegenerative diseases (including ALS).

U.S. polls
Polls conducted by Gallup dating back to 1947 positing the question, "When a person has a disease that cannot be cured, do you think doctors should be allowed to end the patient's life by some painless means if the patient and his family request it?" show support for the practice increasing from 37% in 1947 to a plateau of approximately 75% lasting from approximately 1990 to 2005. When the polling question was modified as such so the question posits "severe pain" as opposed to an incurable disease, "legalization" as opposed to generally allowing doctors, and "patient suicide" rather than physician-administered voluntary euthanasia, public support was substantially lower, by approximately 10% to 15%.

A poll conducted by National Journal and Regence Foundation found that both Oregonians and Washingtonians were more familiar with the terminology "end-of-life care" than the rest of the country and residents of both states are slightly more aware of the terms palliative and hospice care.

A survey from the Journal of Palliative Medicine found that family caregivers of patients who chose assisted death were more likely to find positive meaning in caring for a patient and were more prepared for accepting a patient's death than the family caregivers of patients who did not request assisted death.

Safeguards
Many current assisted death laws contain provisions that are intended to provide oversight and investigative processes to prevent abuse. This includes eligibility and qualification processes, mandatory state reporting by the medical team, and medical board oversight. In Oregon and other states, two doctors and two witnesses must assert that a person's request for a lethal prescription was not coerced or under undue influence.

These safeguards include proving one's residency and eligibility. The patient must meet with two physicians and they must confirm the diagnoses before one can continue the procedure; in some cases, they do include a psychiatric evaluation as well to determine whether or not the patient is making this decision on their own. The next steps are two oral requests, a waiting period of a minimum of 15 days before making the next request. A written request which must be witnessed by two different people, one of which cannot be a family member, and then another waiting period by the patient's doctor in which they say whether they are eligible for the drugs or not ("Death with Dignity").

The debate about whether these safeguards work is debated between opponents and proponents.

A 1996 survey of Oregon emergency physicians found that "Only 37% indicated that the Oregon initiative has enough safeguards to protect vulnerable persons." 83% agreed that patients "Might feel pressure because of burden to others" and 70% agreed that patients "Might feel pressure because of financial concerns".

Religious stances in favor

Unitarian Universalism
According to a 1988 General Resolution, "Unitarian Universalists advocate the right to self-determination in dying, and the release from civil or criminal penalties of those who, under proper safeguards, act to honor the right of terminally ill patients to select the time of their own deaths".

Opposition

Medical ethics

Hippocratic Oath
Some doctors remind that physician-assisted suicide is contrary to the Hippocratic Oath, which is the oath historically taken by physicians. It states "I will not give a lethal drug to anyone if I am asked, nor will I advise such a plan.". The original oath however has been modified many times and, contrary to popular belief, is not required by most modern medical schools, nor confers any legal obligations on individuals who choose to take it. There are also procedures forbidden by the Hippocratic Oath which are in common practice today, such as abortion and execution.

Declaration of Geneva
The Declaration of Geneva is a revision of the Hippocratic Oath, first drafted in 1948 by the World Medical Association in response to forced (involuntary) euthanasia, eugenics and other medical crimes performed in Nazi Germany. It contains, "I will maintain the utmost respect for human life."

International Code of Medical Ethics
The International Code of Medical Ethics, last revised in 2006, includes "A physician shall always bear in mind the obligation to respect human life" in the section "Duties of physicians to patients".

Statement of Marbella
The Statement of Marbella was adopted by the 44th World Medical Assembly in Marbella, Spain, in 1992. It provides that "physician-assisted suicide, like voluntary euthanasia, is unethical and must be condemned by the medical profession."

Concerns of expansion to people with chronic disorders

A concern present among health care professionals who are opposed to PAS, are the detrimental effects that the procedure can have with regard to vulnerable populations. This argument is known as the "slippery slope". This argument encompasses the apprehension that once PAS is initiated for the terminally ill it will progress to other vulnerable communities, namely disabled people, and may begin to be used by those who feel less worthy based on their demographic or socioeconomic status. In addition, vulnerable populations are more at risk of untimely deaths because, "patients might be subjected to PAS without their genuine consent".

Religious stances in opposition

Catholicism
The Roman Catholic Church acknowledges the fact that moral decisions regarding a person's life must be made according to one's own conscience and faith. Catholic tradition has said that one's concern for the suffering of another is not a sufficient reason to decide whether it is appropriate to act upon voluntary euthanasia. According to the Catechism of the Catholic Church, "God is the creator and author of all life." In this belief system God created human life, therefore God is the judge of when to end life. From the Roman Catholic Church's perspective, deliberately ending one's life or the life of another is morally wrong and defies the Catholic doctrine. Furthermore, ending one's life deprives that person and his or her loved ones of the time left in life and causes grief and sorrow for those left behind.

Pope Francis is the current dominant figure of the Catholic Church. He affirms that death is a glorious event and should not be decided for by anyone other than God. Pope Francis insinuates that defending life means defending its sacredness. The Roman Catholic Church teaches its followers that the act of euthanasia is unacceptable because it is perceived as a sin, as it goes against one of the Ten Commandments.  As implied by the sixth commandment, "Thou shalt not kill (You shall not kill),"  the act of assisted suicide contradicts the dignity of human life as well as the respect one has for God. Additionally, the Roman Catholic Church recommends that terminally ill patients should receive palliative care, which deals with physical pain while treating psychological and spiritual suffering as well, instead of physician-assisted suicide.

Judaism
While preservation of life is one of the greatest values in Judaism, there are instances of suicide and assisted suicide appearing in the Bible and Rabbinic literature. The medieval authorities debate the legitimacy of those measures and in what limited circumstances they might apply. The conclusion of the majority of later rabbinic authorities, and accepted normative practice within Judaism, is that suicide and assisted suicide can not be sanctioned even for a terminal patient in intractable pain.

The Church of Jesus Christ of Latter-day Saints
The Church of Jesus Christ of Latter-day Saints (LDS Church) is against assisted suicide and euthanasia, and anyone who takes part in either is regarded as having violated the commandments of God. However the church recognizes that when a person is in the final stages of terminal illness there may be difficult decisions to be taken. The church states that "When dying becomes inevitable, death should be looked upon as a blessing and a purposeful part of an eternal existence. Members should not feel obligated to extend mortal life by means that are unreasonable".

Neutrality
There have been calls for organisations representing medical professionals to take a neutral stance on PAS, rather than a position of opposition. The reasoning is that this supposedly would better reflect the views of medical professionals and that of wider society, and prevent those bodies from exerting undue influence over the debate.

The UK Royal College of Nursing voted in July 2009 to move to a neutral position on PAS.

The California Medical Association dropped its long-standing opposition in 2015 during the debate over whether a Physician Assisted Suicide bill should be introduced there, prompted in part by cancer sufferer Brittany Maynard. The California End of Life Option Act was signed into law later that year.

In December 2017, the Massachusetts Medical Society (MMS) voted to repeal their opposition to physician-assisted suicide and adopt a position of neutrality.

In October 2018, the American Academy of Family Physicians (AAFP) voted to adopt a position of neutrality from one of opposition. This is contrary to the position taken by the American Medical Association (AMA), who oppose it.

In January 2019 the British Royal College of Physicians announced it would adopt a position of neutrality until two-thirds of its members thinks it should either support or oppose the legalization of PAS.

In September 2021, the largest doctors union in the United Kingdom, the British Medical Association, adopted a neutral stance towards a change in the law on assisted dying, replacing their position of opposition which had been in place since 2006.

American Medical Association Code of Ethics 
The American Medical Association (AMA) opposes physician assisted suicide. In response to the ongoing debate about PAS, the AMA has issued guidance for both those who support and oppose physician-assisted suicide. The AMA Code of Ethics Opinion 5.7 reads that "Physician-assisted suicide is fundamentally incompatible with the physician's role as healer" and that it would be "difficult or impossible to control, and would pose serious societal risks" but does not explicitly prohibit the practice. In the AMA Code of Ethics Opinion 1.1.7, which the AMA states "articulates the thoughtful moral basis for those who support assisted suicide", it is written that outside of specific situations in which physicians have clear obligations, such as emergency care or respect for civil rights, "physicians may be able to act (or refrain from acting) in accordance with the dictates of their conscience without violating their professional obligations."

Attitudes of healthcare professionals
It is widely believed that physicians should play a significant role, usually expressed as "gatekeeper", in the process of assisted suicide and voluntary euthanasia (as evident in the name "physician-assisted suicide"), often putting them at the forefront of the issue. Decades of opinion research shows that physicians in the US and several European countries are less supportive of legalization of PAS than the general public. In the US, although "about two-thirds of the American public since the 1970s" have supported legalization, surveys of physicians "rarely show as much as half supporting a move". However, physician and other healthcare professional opinions vary widely on the issue of physician-assisted suicide, as shown in the following tables.

A 2019 survey of US physicians found that 60% of physicians answered 'yes' to the question "Should PAS be legalized in your state?"  The survey discovered that physicians are concerned about a possible "slippery slope". 30% agreed that "PAS/AID would lead to the legalization of euthanasia" and 46% agreed that "Health insurance companies would cover PAS/AID over more expensive, possibly life-saving treatments, like chemotherapy". The survey also found that physicians generally misunderstand why patients seek PAS. 49% of physicians agreed that "Most patients who seek PAS/AID do so because of physical pain", whereas studies in Oregon found that "the three most frequently mentioned end-of-life concerns were loss of autonomy (89.5%), decreasing ability to participate in activities that made life enjoyable (89.5%), and loss of dignity (65.4%)." In addition, the survey found uncertainty about the adequacy of safeguards. While 59% agreed that "Current PAS laws provide adequate safeguards", there was greater concern with respect to specific safeguards. 60% disagreed that "Physicians who are not psychiatrists are sufficiently trained to screen for depression in patients who are seeking PAS" and 60% disagreed that "Most physicians can predict with certainty whether a patient seeking PAS/AID has 6 months or less to live". The concern about adequate safeguards is even greater among Oregon emergency physicians, among whom one study found that “Only 37% indicated that the Oregon initiative has enough safeguards to protect vulnerable persons."

Attitudes toward PAS vary by health profession as well; an extensive survey of 3733 medical physicians was sponsored by the National Council for Palliative Care, Age Concern, Help the Hospices, Macmillan Cancer Support, the Motor Neurone Disease Association, the MS Society and Sue Ryder Care showed that opposition to voluntary euthanasia and PAS was highest among Palliative Care and Care of the Elderly specialists, with more than 90% of palliative care specialists against a change in the law.

In a 1997 study by Glasgow University's Institute of Law & Ethics in Medicine found pharmacists (72%) and anaesthetists (56%) to be generally in favor of legalizing PAS. Pharmacists were twice as likely as medical GPs to endorse the view that "if a patient has decided to end their own life then doctors should be allowed in law to assist". A report published in January 2017 by NPR suggests that the thoroughness of protections that allow physicians to refrain from participating in the municipalities that legalized assisted suicide within the United States presently creates a lack of access by those who would otherwise be eligible for the practice.

A poll in the United Kingdom showed that 54% of General Practitioners are either supportive or neutral towards the introduction of assisted dying laws. A similar poll on Doctors.net.uk published in the BMJ said that 55% of doctors would support it. In contrast the BMA, which represents doctors in the UK, opposes it.

An anonymous, confidential postal survey of all General Practitioners in Northern Ireland, conducted in the year 2000, found that over 70% of responding GPs were opposed to physician-assisted suicide and voluntary active euthanasia.

Legality

Physician-assisted suicide is legal in some countries, under certain circumstances, including Austria, Belgium, Canada, Luxembourg, the Netherlands, New Zealand, Spain, Switzerland and parts of the United States (California, Colorado, Hawaii, Maine, Montana, New Jersey, New Mexico, Oregon, Vermont, Washington and Washington DC) and Australia (New South Wales, Queensland, South Australia, Tasmania, Victoria and Western Australia). The Constitutional Courts of Colombia, Germany and Italy legalized assisted suicide, but their governments have not legislated or regulated the practice yet.

Australia

Laws regarding assisted suicide in Australia are a matter for state and territory governments. Physician assisted suicide is currently legal in all Australian states: New South Wales, Victoria, Western Australia, Tasmania and Queensland. It remains illegal in all Australian territories.

Under Victorian law, patients can ask medical practitioners regarding voluntary assisted dying, and doctors, including conscientious objectors, should refer to appropriately trained colleagues who do not conscientiously object. Health practitioners are restricted from initiating conversation or suggesting voluntary assisted dying to a patient unprompted.

Voluntary euthanasia was legal in the Northern Territory for a short time under the Rights of the Terminally Ill Act 1995, until this law was overturned by the Federal Government who also removed the ability for territories to pass legislation relating to assisted dying, however this was repealed in December 2022 with the passing of Restoring Territory Rights Act. The highly controversial 'Euthanasia Machine', the first invented voluntary assisted dying machine of its kind, created by Philip Nitschke, utilised during this period is presently held at London's Science Museum.

Austria

In December 2020, the Austrian Constitutional Court ruled that the prohibition of assisted suicide was unconstitutional. In December 2021, the Austrian Parliament legalized assisted suicide for those who are terminally ill or have a permanent, debilitating condition.

Belgium
The Euthanasia Act legalized voluntary euthanasia in Belgium in 2002, but it did not cover physician-assisted suicide.

Canada

In Canada, physician-assisted suicide was first legalized in the Province of Quebec on 5 June 2014. It was declared nationally legal by the Supreme Court of Canada on 6 February 2015, in Carter v. Canada (Attorney General). 

National legislation formalizing physician-assisted suicide passed in mid-June 2016, for patients facing an estimated death within six months. Eligibility criteria have been progressively expanded over time. As of March 2021, individuals no longer need to be terminally ill in order to qualify for assisted suicide. Legislation allowing for assisted suicide for mental illness was expected to come into force on March 17 2023, but has since been postponed until 2024.

Between 10 December 2015 and 30 June 2017, 2,149 medically assisted deaths were documented in Canada. Research published by Health Canada illustrates physician preference for physician-administered voluntary euthanasia, citing concerns of effective administration and prevention of the potential complications of self-administration by patients.

China
In China, assisted suicide is illegal under Articles 232 and 233 of the Criminal Law of the People's Republic of China. In China, suicide or neglect is considered homicide and can be punished by three to seven years in prison. 
In May 2011, Zhong Yichun, a farmer, was sentenced two years' imprisonment by the People's Court of Longnan County, in China's Jiangxi Province for assisting Zeng Qianxiang to commit suicide. Zeng had mental illness and repeatedly asked Zhong to help him commit suicide. In October 2010, Zeng took excessive sleeping pills and lay in a cave. As planned, Zhong called him 15 minutes later to confirm that he was dead and buried him. However, according to the autopsy report, the cause of death was from suffocation, not an overdose. Zhong was convicted of criminal negligence. In August 2011, Zhong appealed the court sentence, but it was rejected.

In 1992, a physician was accused of murdering a patient with advanced cancer by lethal injection. He was eventually acquitted.

Colombia
In May 1997 the Colombian Constitutional Court allowed for the voluntary euthanasia of sick patients who requested to end their lives, by passing Article 326 of the 1980 Penal Code. This ruling owes its success to the efforts of a group that strongly opposed voluntary euthanasia. When one of its members brought a lawsuit to the Colombian Supreme Court against it, the court issued a 6 to 3 decision that "spelled out the rights of a terminally ill person to engage in voluntary euthanasia".

Publicized cases
In January 2022 Victor Escobar became the first person in the Andean country with a non-terminal illness to die by legally regulated euthanasia. The 60-year-old Escobar had end-stage chronic obstructive pulmonary disease.

Denmark
Assisted suicide is illegal in Denmark. Passive euthanasia, or the refusal to accept treatment, is not illegal. A survey from 2014 found that 71% of Denmark's population was in favor of legalizing voluntary euthanasia and physician-assisted suicide.

France
Assisted suicide is not legal in France. The controversy over legalising voluntary euthanasia and physician-assisted suicide is not as big as in the United States because of the country's "well developed hospice care programme". However, in 2000 the controversy over the topic was ignited with Vincent Humbert. After a car crash that left him "unable to 'walk, see, speak, smell or taste'", he used the movement of his right thumb to write a book, I Ask the Right to Die (Je vous demande le droit de mourir), in which he voiced his desire to "die legally". After his appeal was denied, his mother assisted in killing him by injecting him with an overdose of barbiturates that put him into a coma, killing him two days later. Though his mother was arrested for aiding in her son's death and later acquitted, the case did jump-start new legislation which states that when medicine serves "no other purpose than the artificial support of life" it can be "suspended or not undertaken".

Germany
Killing somebody in accordance with their demands is always illegal under the German criminal code (Paragraph 216, "Killing at the request of the victim").

Assisting suicide is generally legal and the Federal Constitutional Court has ruled that it is generally protected under the Basic Law; in 2020, it overturned a ban on commercialization of assisted suicide. Since suicide itself is legal, assistance or encouragement is not punishable by the usual legal mechanisms dealing with complicity and incitement (German criminal law follows the idea of "accessories of complicity" which states that "the motives of a person who incites another person to commit suicide, or who assists in its commission, are irrelevant").

Travel to Switzerland
Between 1998 and 2018 around 1250 German citizens (almost three times the number of any other nationality) travelled to Dignitas in Zurich, Switzerland, for an assisted suicide, where this has been legal since 1998. Switzerland is one of the few countries that permits assisted suicide for non-resident foreigners.

Physician-assisted suicide
Physician-assisted suicide was formally legalised on 26 February 2020 when Germany's top court removed the prohibition of "professionally assisted suicide".

Iceland
Assisted suicide is illegal.

Ireland
Assisted suicide is illegal. "Both euthanasia and assisted suicide are illegal under Irish law. Depending on the circumstances, euthanasia is regarded as either manslaughter or murder and is punishable by up to life imprisonment."

Italy 
On 25 September 2019, the Italian Constitutional Court ruling 242/2019 declared that article 580 of the criminal code was unconstitutional; the decriminalisation of assisted suicide in the case of those who aid people who suffer of an irreversible pathology to die, effectively legalised assisted suicide. The Italian Parliament has not yet passed a law regulating assisted suicide. On 16 June 2022, the first assisted suicide was performed.

Jersey
On 25 November 2021, the States Assembly voted to legalise assisted dying and a law legalising it will be drafted in due course. The Channel Island is the first country in the British Islands to approve the measure. The proposition, which was lodged by the Council of Ministers, proposes that a legal assisted dying service should be set up for residents over the age of 18 with a terminal illness or other incurable suffering. The service will be voluntary and methods are either physician-assisted suicide or euthanasia.

This follows a campaign and overwhelming public support. Paul Gazzard and his late husband Alain du Chemin were key actors in the campaign in favour of legalising assisted dying. A citizen's jury was established, which recommended that assisted dying be legalised in the island.

Luxembourg
After again failing to get royal assent for legalizing voluntary euthanasia and physician-assisted suicide, in December 2008 Luxembourg's parliament amended the country's constitution to take this power away from the monarch, the Grand Duke of Luxembourg. Voluntary euthanasia and physician-assisted suicide were legalized in the country in April 2009.

Netherlands

The Netherlands was the first country in the world to formally legalise voluntary euthanasia. Physician-assisted suicide is legal under the same conditions as voluntary euthanasia. Physician-assisted suicide became allowed under the Act of 2001 which states the specific procedures and requirements needed in order to provide such assistance. Assisted suicide in the Netherlands follows a medical model which means that only doctors of patients who are suffering "unbearably without hope" are allowed to grant a request for an assisted suicide. The Netherlands allows people over the age of 12 to pursue an assisted suicide when deemed necessary.

New Zealand

Assisted suicide was decriminalised after a binding referendum in 2020 on New Zealand's End of Life Choice Act 2019. The legislation provided for a year long delay before it took effect on 6 November 2021. Under Section 179 of the Crimes Act 1961, it is illegal to 'aid and abet suicide' and this will remain the case outside the framework established under the End of Life Choice Act.

Norway
Assisted suicide is illegal in Norway. It is considered as murder, and is punishable by up to 21 years imprisonment.

South Africa
South Africa is struggling with the debate over legalizing voluntary euthanasia and physician-assisted suicide. Owing to the underdeveloped health care system that pervades the majority of the country, Willem Landman, "a member of the South African Law Commission, at a symposium on euthanasia at the World Congress of Family Doctors" stated that many South African doctors would be willing to perform acts of voluntary euthanasia when it became legalized in the country. He feels that because of the lack of doctors in the country, "[legalizing] euthanasia in South Africa would be premature and difficult to put into practice ...".

On 30 April 2015 the High Court in Pretoria granted Advocate Robin Stransham-Ford an order that would allow a doctor to assist him in taking his own life without the threat of prosecution. On 6 December 2016 the Supreme Court of Appeal overturned the High Court ruling.

Switzerland

Though it is illegal to assist a patient in dying in some circumstances, there are others where there is no offence committed. The relevant provision of the Swiss Criminal Code refers to "a person who, for selfish reasons, incites someone to commit suicide or who assists that person in doing so will, if the suicide was carried out or attempted, be sentenced to a term of imprisonment (Zuchthaus) of up to 5 years or a term of imprisonment (Gefängnis)."

A person brought to court on a charge could presumably avoid conviction by proving that they were "motivated by the good intentions of bringing about a requested death for the purposes of relieving "suffering" rather than for "selfish" reasons. In order to avoid conviction, the person has to prove that the deceased knew what he or she was doing, had capacity to make the decision, and had made an "earnest" request, meaning they asked for death several times. The person helping also has to avoid actually doing the act that leads to death, lest they be convicted under Article 114: Killing on request (Tötung auf Verlangen) –
A person who, for decent reasons, especially compassion, kills a person on the basis of his or her serious and insistent request, will be sentenced to a term of imprisonment (Gefängnis). For instance, it should be the suicide subject who actually presses the syringe or takes the pill, after the helper had prepared the setup. This way the country can criminalise certain controversial acts, which many of its people would oppose, while legalising a narrow range of assistive acts for some of those seeking help to end their lives.

Switzerland is one of only a handful of countries in the world which permits assisted suicide for non-resident foreigners, causing what some critics have described as suicide tourism. Between 1998 and 2018 around 1250 German citizens (almost three times the number of any other nationality) travelled to Dignitas in Zurich, Switzerland, for an assisted suicide. During the same period over 400 British citizens also opted to end their life at the same clinic.

In May 2011, Zurich held a referendum that asked voters whether (i) assisted suicide should be prohibited outright; and (ii) whether Dignitas and other assisted suicide providers should not admit overseas users. Zurich voters heavily rejected both bans, despite anti-euthanasia lobbying from two Swiss social conservative political parties, the Evangelical People's Party of Switzerland and Federal Democratic Union. The outright ban proposal was rejected by 84% of voters, while 78% voted to keep services open should overseas users require them.

In Switzerland non-physician-assisted suicide is legal, the assistance mostly being provided by volunteers, whereas in Belgium and the Netherlands, a physician must be present. In Switzerland, the doctors are primarily there to assess the patient's decision capacity and prescribe the lethal drugs. Additionally, unlike cases in the United States, a person is not required to have a terminal illness but only the capacity to make decisions. About 25% of people in Switzerland who take advantage of assisted suicide do not have a terminal illness but are simply old or "tired of life".

Publicized cases
In January 2006 British doctor Anne Turner took her own life in a Zurich clinic having developed an incurable degenerative disease. Her story was reported by the BBC and later, in 2009, made into a TV film A Short Stay in Switzerland starring Julie Walters.

In July 2009, British conductor Sir Edward Downes and his wife Joan died together at a suicide clinic outside Zürich "under circumstances of their own choosing". Sir Edward was not terminally ill, but his wife was diagnosed with rapidly developing cancer.

In March 2010, the American PBS TV program Frontline showed a documentary called The Suicide Tourist which told the story of Professor Craig Ewert, his family, and Dignitas, and their decision to commit assisted suicide using sodium pentobarbital in Switzerland after he was diagnosed and suffering with ALS (Lou Gehrig's disease).

In June 2011, the BBC televised the assisted suicide of Peter Smedley, a canning factory owner, who was suffering from motor neurone disease. The programme – Sir Terry Pratchett's Choosing To Die – told the story of Smedley's journey to the end where he used The Dignitas Clinic, a voluntary euthanasia clinic in Switzerland, to assist him in carrying out his suicide. The programme shows Smedley eating chocolates to counter the unpalatable taste of the liquid he drinks to end his life. Moments after drinking the liquid, Smedley begged for water, gasped for breath and became red, he then fell into a deep sleep where he snored heavily while holding his wife's hand. Minutes later, Smedley stopped breathing and his heart stopped beating.

Uruguay

Assisted suicide, while criminal, does not appear to have caused any convictions, as article 37 of the Penal Code (effective 1934) states: "The judges are authorized to forego punishment of a person whose previous life has been honorable where he commits a homicide motivated by compassion, induced by repeated requests of the victim."

United Kingdom

England and Wales
Deliberately assisting a suicide is illegal. Between 2003 and 2006, Lord Joffe made four attempts to introduce bills that would have legalised physician-assisted suicide in England and Wales. All were rejected by the UK Parliament. In the meantime, the Director of Public Prosecutions has clarified the criteria under which an individual will be prosecuted in England and Wales for assisting in another person's suicide. These have not been tested by an appellate court as yet.
In 2014, Lord Falconer of Thoroton tabled an Assisted Dying Bill in the House of Lords which passed its Second Reading but ran out of time before the General Election. During its passage peers voted down two amendments which were proposed by opponents of the Bill. In 2015, Labour MP Rob Marris introduced another Bill, based on the Falconer proposals, in the House of Commons. The Second Reading was the first time the House was able to vote on the issue since 1997. A Populus poll had found that 82% of the British public agreed with the proposals of Lord Falconer's Assisted Dying Bill. However, in a free vote on 11 September 2015, only 118 MPs were in favour and 330 against, thus defeating the bill.

Scotland
Unlike the other jurisdictions in the United Kingdom, suicide was not illegal in Scotland before 1961 (and still is not) thus no associated offences were created in imitation. Depending on the actual nature of any assistance given to a suicide, the offences of murder or culpable homicide might be committed or there might be no offence at all; the nearest modern prosecutions bearing comparison might be those where a culpable homicide conviction has been obtained when drug addicts have died unintentionally after being given "hands on" non-medical assistance with an injection. Modern law regarding the assistance of someone who intends to die has a lack of certainty as well as a lack of relevant case law; this has led to attempts to introduce statutes providing more certainty.

Independent MSP Margo MacDonald's "End of Life Assistance Bill" was brought before the Scottish Parliament to permit physician-assisted suicide in January 2010. The Catholic Church and the Church of Scotland, the largest denomination in Scotland, opposed the bill. The bill was rejected by a vote of 85–16 (with 2 abstentions) in December 2010.

 The Assisted Suicide (Scotland) Bill was introduced on 13 November 2013 by the late Margo MacDonald MSP and was taken up by Patrick Harvie MSP on Ms MacDonald's death. The Bill entered the main committee scrutiny stage in January 2015 and reached a vote in Parliament several months later; however the bill was again rejected.

Northern Ireland
Health is a devolved matter in the United Kingdom and as such it would be for the Northern Ireland Assembly to legislate for assisted dying as it sees fit. As of 2018, there has been no such bill tabled in the Assembly.

Assisted Dying Coalition
A coalition of assisted dying organizations working in favour of legal recognition of the right to die was formed in early 2019.

United States

Assisted death is legal in the American states of California (via the California End of Life Option Act of 2015, enacted June 2016), Colorado (End of Life Options Act of 2016), Hawaii (Death with Dignity Act of 2018), Oregon (via the Oregon Death with Dignity Act, 1994), Washington (state) (Washington Death with Dignity Act of 2008), Washington, DC (District of Columbia Death with Dignity Act of 2016), New Jersey (New Jersey Dignity in Dying Bill of Rights Act of 2019), New Mexico (Elizabeth Whitefield End-of-Life Options Act, 2021), Maine (eff. 1 January 2020 – Maine Death with Dignity Act of 2019) and Vermont (Patient Choice and Control at End of Life Act of 2013). In Montana]], the Montana Supreme Court ruled in Baxter v. Montana (2009) that it found no law or public policy reason that would prohibit physician-assisted dying. Oregon and Washington specify some restrictions. It was briefly legal in New Mexico from 2014 due to a court decision, but this verdict was overturned in 2015. New Mexico is the most recent state to legalize physician-assisted suicide, with the Elizabeth Whitefield End-of-Life Options Act being signed by Governor Michelle Lujan Grisham on 8 April 2021, and scheduled to go into effect on 18 June 2021.

Oregon requires a physician to prescribe drugs and they must be self-administered. In order to be eligible, the patient must be diagnosed by an attending physician as well as by a consulting physician, with a terminal illness that will cause the death of the individual within six months. The law states that, in order to participate, a patient must be: 1) 18 years of age or older, 2) a resident of Oregon, 3) capable of making and communicating health care decisions for him/herself, and 4) diagnosed with a terminal illness that will lead to death within six months. It is up to the attending physician to determine whether these criteria have been met. It is required the patient orally request the medication at least twice and contribute at least one (1) written request. The physician must notify the patient of alternatives; such as palliative care, hospice and pain management. Lastly the physician is to request but not require the patient to notify their next of kin that they are requesting a prescription for a lethal dose of medication. Assuming all guidelines are met and the patient is deemed competent and completely sure they wish to end their life, the physician will prescribe the drugs.

The law was passed in 1997. As of 2013, a total of 1,173 people had DWDA prescriptions written and 752 patients had died from ingesting drugs prescribed under the DWDA. In 2013, there were approximately 22 assisted deaths per 10,000 total deaths in Oregon.

Washington's rules and restrictions are similar, if not exactly the same, as Oregon's. Not only does the patient have to meet the above criteria, they also have to be examined by not one, but two doctors licensed in their state of residence. Both doctors must come to the same conclusion about the patient's prognosis. If one doctor does not see the patient fit for the prescription, then the patient must undergo psychological inspection to tell whether or not the patient is in fact capable and mentally fit to make the decision of assisted death or not.

In May 2013, Vermont became the fourth state in the union to legalize medical aid-in-dying. Vermont's House of Representatives voted 75–65 to approve the bill, Patient Choice and Control at End of Life Act. This bill states that the qualifying patient must be at least 18, a Vermont resident and suffering from an incurable and irreversible disease, with less than six months to live. Also, two physicians, including the prescribing doctor must make the medical determination. In August 2022, a Connecticut resident with end-stage cancer sued Vermont to remove their residency requirement for medical aid-in-dying, arguing that it was unconstitutional. The case has not yet been ruled on.

In January 2014, it seemed as though New Mexico had inched closer to being the fifth state in the United States to legalize physician-assisted suicide via a court ruling. "This court cannot envision a right more fundamental, more private or more integral to the liberty, safety and happiness of a New Mexican than the right of a competent, terminally ill patient to choose aid in dying," wrote Judge Nan G. Nash of the Second District Court in Albuquerque. The NM attorney general's office said it was studying the decision and whether to appeal to the State Supreme Court. However, this was overturned on 11 August 2015 by the New Mexico Court of Appeals, in a 2–1 ruling, that overturned the Bernalillo County District Court Ruling. The Court gave the verdict: "We conclude that aid in dying is not a fundamental liberty interest under the New Mexico Constitution". On 8 April 2021, the Governor of New Mexico signed the Elizabeth Whitefield End-of-Life Options Act, legalizing assisted suicide in the state. The law is set to take effect on 18 June 2021.

In November 2016, the citizens of Colorado approved Proposition 106, the Colorado End of Life Options Act, with 65% in favor. This made it the third state to legalize medical aid-in-dying by a vote of the people, raising the total to six states.

The punishment for participating in physician-assisted death (PAD) varies throughout many states. The state of Wyoming does not "recognize common law crimes and does not have a statute specifically prohibiting physician-assisted suicide". In Florida, "every person deliberately assisting another in the commission of self-murder shall be guilty of manslaughter, a felony of the second degree".

 States currently considering physician-assisted suicide laws
Arizona, Connecticut, Indiana, New York, and Virginia.

 Washington vs. Glucksberg 

In Washington, physician-assisted suicide did not become legal until 2008. In 1997, four Washington physicians and three terminally ill patients brought forth a lawsuit that would challenge the ban on medical aid in dying that was in place at the time. This lawsuit was first part of a district court hearing, where it ruled in favor of Glucksberg, which was the group of physicians and terminally ill patients. The lawsuit was then affirmed by the Ninth Circuit. Thus, it was taken to the Supreme Court, and there the Supreme Court decided to grant Washington certiorari. Eventually, the Supreme Court decided, with a unanimous vote, that medical aid in dying was not a protected right under the constitution as of the time of this case.

Brittany Maynard
A highly publicized case in the United States was the death of Brittany Maynard in 2014. After being diagnosed with terminal brain cancer, Maynard decided that instead of suffering with the side effects the cancer would bring, she wanted to choose when she would die. She was residing in California when she was diagnosed, where assisted death was not legal. She and her husband moved to Oregon where assisted death was legal, so she could take advantage of the program. Before her death, she started the Brittany Maynard Fund, which works to legalize the choice of ending one's life in cases of a terminal illness. Her public advocacy motivated her family to continue to try and get assisted death laws passed in all 50 states.

In California

Assisted suicide became legalized on 9 June 2016 under the California End of Life Option Act. This bill gave terminally-ill patients the ability to make decisions regarding time and means of death into their own hands. This medication is prescribed by a licensed physician to a patient who is over the age of 18, living with a chronic and life altering condition that is irreversible, and must be of sound mind to make these decisions. However, once passed in 2016, the bill was only valid for a period of 10 years and was set to need renewal by 2026. On 5 October 2021, California Governor Gavin Newsom signed on to extend the use of the bill until 1 January 2031. The revised bill also shorted the waiting period of approval from 15 days to 48 hours and required health care providers to publish information regarding end of life care on their website. These types of legal changes have been largely beneficial and general acceptance towards assisted suicide has grown. Between 1990 and 1995, physicians became increasingly more receptive to the concept of assisted suicide.

See also 

 Bioethics
 Betty and George Coumbias
 Consensual homicide
 Euthanasia device
 Jack Kevorkian
 Legality of euthanasia
 List of deaths from legal euthanasia and assisted suicide
 Brittany Maynard
 Philip Nitschke
 Right to Die? (2008 film)
 Senicide
 A Short Stay in Switzerland (2009 film)
 Suicide by cop
 Suicide legislation
 Voluntary Assisted Dying Act 2017 (Victoria)
 You Don't Know Jack (2010, film)

Explanatory notes

References

Further reading 

 
 
 
 
 

 
Disability rights
Euthanasia
Suicide methods